The 1930 Vermont gubernatorial election took place on November 4, 1930. Incumbent Republican John E. Weeks did not run for re-election to a third term as Governor of Vermont. Republican candidate Stanley C. Wilson defeated Democratic candidate Park H. Pollard to succeed him.

Republican primary

Candidates
 John W. Gordon, Barre attorney and candidate for U.S. Representative in 1920 and 1924
 W. Arthur Simpson, Lyndon selectman and State Senator
 Stanley C. Wilson, Lieutenant Governor

Results

Democratic primary

Candidates
 Park H. Pollard, nominee for U.S. Senate in 1923

Results

General election

Results

References

Vermont
1930
Gubernatorial
November 1930 events